Blumine is a German word meaning simply "Goddess of Flowers", with no specific mythological source. It may also mean:

Blumine Island
A character from Sartor Resartus by Thomas Carlyle
A rejected movement from Mahler's First Symphony
An 1884 polka by Edward Elgar; see Powick Asylum Music
A variation of the color blue